Chrissy Redden (born 16 March 1966) is a Canadian cross-country cyclist.

Redden participated in the women's cross-country event at the 2000 Summer Olympics in Sydney where she finished in 8th place.

She won a gold medal at the 2002 Commonwealth Games in the women's cross-country event.

She was also named the Canadian female cyclist of the year in 1999 and the Pacific Sport female cyclist of the year in 2001.

References

1966 births
Living people
Canadian female cyclists
Sportspeople from Hamilton, Ontario
Olympic cyclists of Canada
Cyclists at the 2000 Summer Olympics
Cyclists at the 2002 Commonwealth Games
Commonwealth Games gold medallists for Canada
Commonwealth Games medallists in cycling
Medallists at the 2002 Commonwealth Games